Jungsan High School (Hangeul: 중산고등학교, Hanja: 中山高等學校) is located in Irwon-dong, Gangnam-gu, Seoul.

Jungsan High School is a man's private school founded in 1994. This school is famous for various activities done in the club and in the school.

Timeline
 Established an educational foundation "Jungsan Hakwon" on December 19, 1989
 Founded on March 1, 1994
 First entrance ceremony on March 2, 1994
 20th School anniversary on March 25, 2014

Notable alumni

 Moon Hee-joon 
 Song Chang-eui

See also
Education in South Korea

External links
 

High schools in Seoul
Gangnam District
Educational institutions established in 1994
1994 establishments in South Korea
Boys' schools in South Korea